is a Japanese competitor in synchronized swimming.

She won 2 bronze medals at the 2015 World Aquatics Championships. She also won 1 gold and 2 silvers at the 2014 FINA World Junior Synchronised Swimming Championships, and a silver at the 2012 FINA World Junior Synchronised Swimming Championships.

References

Living people
Japanese synchronized swimmers
1996 births
World Aquatics Championships medalists in synchronised swimming
Sportspeople from Kanagawa Prefecture
People from Chigasaki, Kanagawa
Synchronized swimmers at the 2015 World Aquatics Championships
Synchronized swimmers at the 2016 Summer Olympics
Synchronized swimmers at the 2017 World Aquatics Championships
Olympic synchronized swimmers of Japan
Olympic bronze medalists for Japan
Olympic medalists in synchronized swimming
Medalists at the 2016 Summer Olympics
Asian Games silver medalists for Japan
Medalists at the 2018 Asian Games
Artistic swimmers at the 2018 Asian Games
Asian Games medalists in artistic swimming
Artistic swimmers at the 2019 World Aquatics Championships
21st-century Japanese women